Kill 'Em All is the debut studio album by American heavy metal band Metallica, released on July 25, 1983, through the independent label Megaforce Records. Metallica began by playing shows in local clubs in Los Angeles. They recorded several demos to gain attention from club owners and eventually relocated to San Francisco to secure the services of bassist Cliff Burton. The group's No Life 'til Leather demo tape (1982) was noticed by Megaforce label head Jon Zazula, who signed them and provided a budget of $15,000 for recording. The album was recorded in May with producer Paul Curcio at the Music America Studios in Rochester, New York. It was originally intended to be titled Metal Up Your Ass, with cover art featuring a hand clutching a dagger emerging from a toilet bowl. Zazula convinced the band to change the name because distributors feared that releasing an album with such an offensive title and artwork would diminish its chances of commercial success.

Metallica promoted the album on the two-month co-headlining Kill 'Em All for One tour with English heavy metal band Raven in the US. The album also generated two singles: "Whiplash" and "Jump in the Fire". Although the initial shipment was 15,000 copies in the US, the album sold 60,000 copies worldwide by the end of Metallica's Seven Dates of Hell European tour in 1984. The album did not enter the Billboard 200 until 1986, when it peaked at number 155, following Metallica's commercial success with its third studio album, Master of Puppets; the 1988 Elektra reissue peaked at number 120. Kill 'Em All was critically praised at the time of its release and has since been regarded as a groundbreaking album for thrash metal, because of its "precise musicianship, which fused new wave of British heavy metal riffs with hardcore punk tempos". It was also retrospectively placed on a few publications' best album lists. The album's musical approach and lyrics were markedly different from rock's mainstream of the early 1980s and inspired a number of bands who followed in a similar manner. It was certified 3× Platinum by the Recording Industry Association of America (RIAA) in 1999 for shipping three million copies in the United States.

Background and recording

Metallica was formed in 1981 in Los Angeles by drummer Lars Ulrich and by vocalist/rhythm guitarist James Hetfield. Before settling on a definitive lineup, Metal Blade Records owner Brian Slagel asked Metallica to record a song for the first edition of his Metal Massacre compilation. Hetfield and Ulrich chose "Hit the Lights" from Hetfield's and his childhood friend Ron McGovney's previous band Leather Charm, and recorded it with Hetfield on vocals, McGovney on bass, and temporary guitarist Lloyd Grant. The band's first lineup featured Hetfield, Ulrich, McGovney, and guitarist Dave Mustaine, who was acquired through a newspaper advertisement. The band practiced in McGovney's garage and looked for gigs at local clubs. Metallica's first show was on March 14, 1982, at the Radio City in Anaheim. The nine-song setlist consisted of two originals ("Hit the Lights" and an unfinished version of "Jump in the Fire" from Mustaine's earlier band Panic and covers of new wave of British heavy metal (NWOBHM) bands such as Diamond Head, Blitzkrieg, Savage, and Sweet Savage. The gig did not go as well as planned, because Mustaine had problems with the guitar distortion pedal, and broke a string during a song. Metallica's second gig was on March 27, 1982, at Hollywood's Whisky a Go Go, opening for Saxon. Although Mötley Crüe was originally scheduled to open the show, the group canceled because of its growing popularity. Metallica recorded a three-song demo to persuade the venue's management to allow the band to open for Saxon. Metallica's third concert was in April 1982, at which was premiered "The Mechanix", written by Mustaine during his tenure with Panic. Mustaine interacted with the fans at Metallica's earliest shows because Hetfield was shy.

To garner attention from club owners, Metallica recorded the Power Metal demo in April 1982, which featured "Motorbreath" in addition to the already-performed originals. The logo, displaying the band's name with the first and last letter drawn larger with sharp serifs and italicized, was designed by Hetfield. The No Life 'til Leather demo was recorded in July 1982, and it created a buzz in the underground tape trading circles. No Life 'til Leather featured a re-recorded version of "Hit the Lights", which appeared on the second pressing of Metal Massacre, in addition to new songs such as "Phantom Lord", "Seek & Destroy", and "Metal Militia". The recording and mastering was financed by Kenny Kane, owner of the punk label High Velocity, and distributed by Ulrich and his friend Pat Scott. Because of tensions with Mustaine, McGovney left the band in December. Ulrich was impressed by Cliff Burton's performance with Trauma at The Troubadour in West Hollywood, and offered to let him join the band. Burton joined on the condition that Metallica would relocate to the San Francisco area. Moving to El Cerrito in February 1983, the band stayed and rehearsed at Exodus manager Mark Whitaker's house, which they called the "Metallica Mansion". Metallica intended to record its debut in Los Angeles on Slagel's independent label on an $8,000 budget. Slagel could not afford the record, and Ulrich contacted Jon Zazula, a New Jersey record store owner and promoter of heavy metal bands on the East Coast who had already heard No Life 'til Leather. Metallica rented a U-Haul truck and drove to New Jersey in late March, and upon arrival, allowed Zazula to sell copies of No Life 'til Leather to help him found Megaforce Records, because no label wanted to finance the album's recording.
 

 
Hetfield and Ulrich fired Mustaine on the morning of April 11 after a gig in New York, because of his drug and alcohol problems, overly aggressive behavior, and clashes with bandmates. On Whitaker's recommendation, Metallica recruited Kirk Hammett, who played in Exodus and was a one-time student of Joe Satriani. Hammett learned the songs on his flight to New York, and started recording the album with Metallica barely a month later. Metallica met producer Paul Curcio at Music America studios in Rochester, and recorded the album in two weeks. Unable to afford a hotel during the recording sessions, the band members stayed over in people's  houses in Rochester and at the Music Factory in Jamaica, Queens, where Anthrax held rehearsals. Curcio had set the studio equipment as if he were recording an ordinary rock band. He thought the initial tapes sounded very distorted, and tried to compensate by turning down the knobs. Metallica resented Curcio's involvement, because he seemed uninterested, and had little impact on the sound. Although Zazula wanted Hammett to replicate Mustaine's solos, Hammett's guitar solos on the album were partially based on Mustaine's original solos, with the first four bars of most solos written by Mustaine before his departure. Despite their differences, Mustaine's contributions to the early years of Metallica were still acknowledged, and he received four co-writing credits on Kill 'Em All. Zazula was not pleased with the initial mix because he thought that the drums were too loud, and the guitars were too low in the mix. The remix was done by sound engineer Chris Bubacz, according to Zazula's instructions. The final cost for the record rounded to an estimated $15,000, which nearly caused Zazula to go bankrupt. "This was mortgage money I'm spending, not something I've got put by I'm going to invest," he said later. Zazula had a hard time finding a distributor for the record, but he eventually convinced Relativity Records to distribute the album in the US and Canada, and Music for Nations in Europe.
 
The band intended to title the album Metal Up Your Ass with a cover featuring a hand clutching a dagger emerging from a toilet bowl. However, Zazula convinced them to change the title, because he thought that distributors would not stock it as it was too explicit to display. The final cover featured the shadow of a hand letting go of a bloodied hammer. Burton was credited with coming up with the name Kill 'Em All—referring to timid record distributors, saying, "Those record company fuckers ... kill 'em all!"—as a response to the situation. Ulrich thought Kill 'Em All was a good name, and Zazula agreed. Burton suggested to Gary L. Heard, also responsible for the Metallica photograph on the back cover, to feature a bloodied hammer on the album art. According to Hammett, "Cliff carried a hammer with him everywhere he went. He always had a hammer in his luggage, and he would take it out occasionally and start destroying things." Even though the original title was unused, the band did later release a "Metal Up Your Ass" T-shirt with the proposed artwork. A live bootleg recording of a 1982 performance at the Old Waldorf, titled Metal Up Your Ass (Live), featured the original cover artwork. Original pressings of the album came with an inner sleeve that included pictures and lyrics as well as a silver label on the vinyl. Subsequent pressings had a blank white sleeve and standard album label. The 1988 reissue re-introduced the lyrics and photos. The original release can be distinguished by the words "Bang That Head That Doesn't Bang" at the top of the back cover. This was dropped from the reissue. The phrase "Bang That Head That Doesn't Bang" was dedicated to San Francisco fan Ray Burch, known for his headbanging at the band's early shows.

Music and lyrics

 
Kill 'Em All features intricate riffing reminiscent of the NWOBHM bands played at high velocity. The album is considered crucial in thrash metal's genesis because it introduced fast percussion, low-register chords, and shredding leads to the genre. Hammett played some pentatonic patterns in addition to his breakneck solos. Ulrich adopted a double time snare pattern that would become a mainstay on Metallica's subsequent albums. Hetfield's vocals evolved from the melodic wail on No Life 'til Leather to a rough-edged bark, and the entire band played faster and more accurately on Kill 'Em All. Author Joel McIver described Burton's and Hetfield's performances as nearly virtuosic, highlighting Burton's smooth-sounding bass and Hetfield's precise picking skills. According to journalist Chuck Eddy, the juvenile lyrical approach to topics such as warfare, violence and life on the road gives the album a "naive charm". The musical approach on Kill 'Em All was in contrast to the glam metal bands who dominated the charts in the early 1980s. Because of its rebellious nature and Metallica's street appearance, it appealed to fans who were not into the mainstream of hard rock.
 
"Hit the Lights" was based on an unfinished Leather Charm song written by Hetfield and Hugh Tanner. Hetfield had brought the majority of the song to Ulrich, and the two worked out different arrangements. Performed at 160 beats per minute, "Hit the Lights" opens with fade-in distorted guitars and a short shriek by Hetfield. The song is driven by the 16th note repeated main riff and the continuous eighth note snare drum hits. The lyrics celebrate heavy metal itself and are sung with short and high pitched vocals. The song ends with several lengthy guitar solos by Hammett, who performed cleaner and more melodic versions of Mustaine's leads. 

"The Four Horsemen" is a revamp of the Mustaine-penned "The Mechanix", which originally had lyrics about having sex at a gas station. A modified version of his composition with the original lyrics appeared on Megadeth's debut Killing Is My Business... and Business Is Good! (1985), named "Mechanix". Although Mustaine told Metallica not to use any of his music, Hetfield wrote lyrics about the Four Horsemen of the Apocalypse and added a bridge and cleanly picked guitar solo in the middle. Mustaine said the bridge was inspired by the main riff in Lynyrd Skynyrd's "Sweet Home Alabama".
 
"Motorbreath" was written by Hetfield during his time in Leather Charm and tells about life on the road. The song is based on a four-chord verse and a stop-and-start chorus. The most recognizable parts are Ulrich's drum rolls in each chorus and the riff that accompanies Hammett's solos. Because of its speed, the song requires fast picking by the bassist. 

"Jump in the Fire" was the first song ever written by Mustaine, with lyrics about teenage sexual experience. Hetfield's revised lyrics for the album were written from Satan's point of view, describing how the devil watches people killing each other, and is sure they will go to hell for their actions. "Jump in the Fire" was released as a single in the UK in February 1984 to promote a UK tour with Venom. The single featured "Phantom Lord" and "Seek & Destroy" as live tracks, although they are actually studio recordings with fake crowd noise dubbed over them. The single's cover art features an oil painting titled The Devils of D-Day, created by artist Les Edwards in 1978.
 
"(Anesthesia)-Pulling Teeth" is a bass solo by Burton, accompanied on drums by Ulrich. A staple of Burton's live performances since his high school days in the band Agents of Misfortune, the instrumental track featured Burton's distinctive "lead-bass" style of playing, incorporating heavy distortion, use of wah-wah pedal and tapping. Bubacz introduces the track as "Bass solo, take one", informing listeners that the song was recorded in one take. "(Anesthesia)-Pulling Teeth" was the bass solo that Burton was playing when Hetfield and Ulrich first saw him at a gig. Hetfield stated: "We heard this wild solo going on and thought, 'I don't see any guitar player up there.' We were both counting the strings and I finally turned to Lars and said, 'Dude, that's a bass!' Cliff was up there on stage with his band Trauma with a wah-wah pedal and his huge mop of red hair. He didn't care whether people were there. He was looking down at his bass, playing." 

"Whiplash" was the album's first single, issued on August 8, 1983. It features a swift rhythm line of straight 16th notes played at about 200 beats per minute. Hetfield and Burton performed with palm muted technique and precise metronomic control. The lyrics celebrate crowd energy and headbanging. Rock journalist Mick Wall wrote that "Whiplash" signified the birth of thrash metal, stating: "If one wishes to identify the very moment thrash metal arrived spitting and snarling into the world, 'Whiplash' is indisputably it."
 

"Phantom Lord" is a lyrical nod to devilry. The song begins with synthesized bass drone and contains a middle section with clean, arpeggiated guitar chords. Written by Mustaine, its central riff is in NWOBHM fashion. 

"No Remorse" is a mid-tempo song which suddenly accelerates its tempo in the fifth-minute. The song is about not feeling any remorse or sense of repentance during battle. 

"Seek & Destroy" was inspired by Diamond Head's "Dead Reckoning" and is the first song Metallica recorded during the Kill 'Em All sessions. Hetfield wrote the main riff in his truck outside a Los Angeles sticker factory where he was working. Because of its simple, one-line chorus, the song became a permanent setlist fixture and a crowd singalong. 

"Metal Militia", one of the fastest songs on the album, is about heavy metal's way of life and nonconformity. Mustaine composed the main riff, which emulates a marching army. The song ends with tramping feet and bullet ricochet in a fade-out.

Reception

Kill 'Em All received critical acclaim. Bernard Doe of Metal Forces described Kill 'Em All as one of the fastest and heaviest albums ever recorded, and remarked that the album is not for the faint-hearted. Greg Kot of the Chicago Tribune acknowledged it as the "speed metal prototype", but felt the lyrical replication of Judas Priest and the Misfits kept the album short from becoming a classic. In a retrospective review, Billboard praised Kill 'Em All for changing the face of popular music with its unique combination of punk and metal. AllMusic's Steve Huey called it "the true birth of thrash". He praised Hetfield's highly technical rhythm guitar style and said that the band was "playing with tightly controlled fury even at the most ridiculously fast tempos". Rob Kemp, writing in The Rolling Stone Album Guide, credited the album for consolidating the punk rock and heavy metal scenes, but felt that apart from "Seek & Destroy" and "(Anesthesia)-Pulling Teeth", most of the album had the band "trying to look tough" over enthusiastic but unfinished riff-based songs. 

Journalist Martin Popoff said Kill 'Em All differentiated from the debuts by Metallica's Bay Area contemporaries because the fans could identify with Hetfield's lyrics and the band's appearance. Spins Chuck Eddy considered Kill 'Em All the inception of the "extreme metal mania" of the early 1980s. He noted the album did not receive much critical praise at the time of its release but said it aged well and opened the doors for the less commercially successful bands. Although McIver credits Venom's Welcome to Hell (1981) as the first thrash metal album, he acknowledged Kill 'Em All as a major influence on the flourishing American heavy metal scene. Despite its "less-than-perfect" production, Loudwires Jon Wiederhorn said that Kill 'Em All sounds like an "influential slice of history" and stands on the same level as classic albums by Black Sabbath, Iron Maiden, and Judas Priest.
 
Kill 'Em All was released on July 25, 1983 by Megaforce with an initial pressing of 15,000 copies. Because of the label's financial restrictions, the album was pressed in batches of 500 copies. Kill 'Em All had sold 17,000 copies in the US by the end of the year. Similarly to punk rock acts, Metallica promoted its material through the tape trading network and independent music magazines such as Metal Forces in the UK and Metal Mania in the US. The album did not enter the Billboard 200 chart until 1986, when it peaked at number 155 following Metallica's commercial success with its third studio album Master of Puppets. The 1988 re-issue on Elektra Records also charted on the Billboard 200, peaking at number 120. It was certified 3× Platinum by the Recording Industry Association of America (RIAA) in 1999 for shipping three million copies in the United States. Despite being the lowest selling Metallica studio album, it helped the band establish its image and build a fanbase in its inaugural years.
 
Kill 'Em All, as the first thrash metal album released in the US, had substantial impact on the emerging scene and inspired numerous bands with its aggression and austere seriousness. Guitarist Kerry King acknowledged Slayer was still finding its sound while Metallica had already determined its image and musical identity. Anthrax guitarist Scott Ian was impressed by the album's heaviness and songwriting, and said it influenced him as much as the albums by Iron Maiden. Dream Theater's drummer Mike Portnoy observed that Kill 'Em All surpassed the NWOBHM bands in terms of sheer velocity and cited Burton's bass solo as the album's peak. Guitarist Ulf Cederlund of Swedish black metal band Morbid cited "Motorbreath" and "Metal Militia" as songs that influenced him as a young musician. Kill 'Em All was ranked at number 35 on Rolling Stones list of The 100 Greatest Albums of the '80s. Additionally, the album placed at number 54 on "The 100 Best Debut Albums of All Time" and again at number 35 on "100 Greatest Metal Albums of All Time", two lists compiled by the same magazine. Kerrang! listed the album at number 29 among the "100 Greatest Heavy Metal Albums of All Time". In 2010, Consequence of Sound ranked it number 94 among its "Top 100 Albums Ever".

Touring
In late July 1983, Metallica embarked on the two-month Kill 'Em All for One tour with British co-headliners Raven. The tour name melded the titles of the albums the two bands were promoting: Metallica's Kill 'Em All and Raven's All for One, both released on Megaforce. The two groups met in Zazula's home two days before the tour began and traveled in the same vehicle throughout the tour with five roadies and sound engineer Whitaker. The tour was set to conclude with three shows in San Francisco, thus Hetfield painted "No Life 'til Frisco" on the Winnebago tour bus. The tour had a few poorly attended gigs, such as a performance at the Cheers club in Babylon, New York, attended by some 50 people. After the conclusion of Kill 'Em All for One in early September, Metallica returned to El Cerrito to work on new material. Seven weeks after the tour ended, Metallica booked a number of performances at Bay Area clubs, the first a Halloween gig at the Keystone in Palo Alto. At the Country Club in Reseda, the group debuted "Fight Fire with Fire" and "Creeping Death", along with an early version of "The Call of Ktulu", then titled "When Hell Freezes Over". Three days later, at a gig at The Stone in San Francisco, Metallica premiered "Ride the Lightning", the title track from the upcoming album. In December, Metallica went on a short tour in the Midwest and eastern United States with a three-man road crew: Whitaker, guitar technician John Marshall, and drum technician Dave Marrs. The concert of January 14, 1984, in Boston was canceled because the band's equipment was stolen the night before.
 
In February, Metallica embarked on its first European trek with Twisted Sister, supporting Venom's Seven Dates of Hell tour. The tour was sponsored by Metallica's UK distributor, Music for Nations, who released the "Jump in the Fire" EP for that occasion. The first show was at the Volkshaus in Zurich on February 3. At the Aardschok Festival in Zwolle on February 11, Metallica played in front of 7,000 people, its largest audience at the time. The tour stretched through countries such as Italy, Germany, France, and Belgium, culminating in two sold-out shows at the Marquee Club in London. After concluding the Seven Dates of Hell tour, Metallica headed to Sweet Silence Studios in Copenhagen to record its sophomore album Ride the Lightning. By the end of the tour, Kill 'Em All had sold 60,000 copies worldwide and Metallica began to gain international recognition. On June 8, 2013, at the Orion Festival, billed as the fictional band Dehaan, Metallica played the album in its entirety for the first time ever to mark the 30 year anniversary of the album.

Track listing
Original release
All lyrics written by James Hetfield, except where noted. The bonus tracks on the 1988 re-release were originally recorded as B-sides for the "Creeping Death" single in 1984, later known as Garage Days Revisited, and would later appear on the compilation album Garage Inc. (1998). The bonus tracks on the digital reissue were recorded live at the Seattle Coliseum, Seattle, Washington, on August 29, 1989, and also appeared on the live album Live Shit: Binge & Purge (1993).

2016 deluxe edition
In 2016, the album was remastered and reissued in a limited edition deluxe box set with an expanded track listing and bonus content. The deluxe edition set includes the original album on vinyl and CD, a picture disc with the original "Jump in the Fire" single tracklist, four CDs of interviews, rough mixes, and live recordings recorded from 1983 to 1984, and a DVD of a live concert in Chicago.

Personnel
Credits are adapted from the album's liner notes.

 James Hetfield – vocals, rhythm guitar
 Kirk Hammett – lead guitar
 Cliff Burton – bass
 Lars Ulrich – drums

* Jason Newsted – bass, backing vocals on the digital reissue bonus tracksProduction Paul Curcio – production
 Jon Zazula – executive producer
 Chris Bubacz – engineer
 Andy Wroblewski – assistant engineer
 Jack Skinner – mastering
 Bob Ludwig – mastering (Elektra reissue)
 George Marino – 1995 remastering
 Howie Weinberg – 2016 remastering

 Metallica, Mark Whitaker – production on the Elektra reissue bonus tracks
 Jeffrey "Nik" Norman – engineer on the Elektra reissue bonus tracks
 Mike Gillies – mixing on the digital reissue bonus tracksArtwork'''
 Gary L. Heard – front and back cover design photos
 Kevin Hodapp – inner sleeve photos
 Shari & Harold Risch – graphics, design and layout

Charts

Certifications

References

 
Bibliography

External links

 (bootleg release featuring the original cover concept for Kill 'Em All'')
 

Metallica albums
1983 debut albums
Megaforce Records albums
Elektra Records albums
Vertigo Records albums